Olivia Cenizal (October 21, 1926 – April 14, 2008) was a Filipina film actress.

She was born as Gloria Pagtakhan Maigue in Imus, Cavite into a musical family. She was reportedly encouraged by Cirio H. Santiago to become a film actress. Her film debut was in Palahamak (1955). Her name was changed to Olivia because Gloria Romero was already prominent in the local cinema and because Cenizal reportedly resembled the American film actress Olivia de Havilland.

Cenizal was twice nominated for a Famas Best Actress Award, for Desperado (1956), and Water Lily (1958). Cenizal retired from an active film career in the 1970s, though she occasionally appeared in films until the 1990s.

Death
Olivia Cenizal died on April 14, 2008, aged 81, from complications from an undisclosed colon disease. She was survived by her husband, Josefino Cenizal, a composer.

Filmography
1955 - Palahamak - Premiere Productions
1955 - Minera - Premiere Productions
1955 - Ha Cha Cha - People's Pictures
1955 - Pangako ng Puso - Larry Santiago Productions
1955 - Pandanggo ni Neneng - Premiere Productions
1955 - Pitong Maria - Larry Santiago Productions
1956 - Desperado - People's Pictures
1956 - Margarita - People's Pictures
1956 - Prinsipe Villarba - People's Pictures
1956 - Haring Espada - People's Pictures
1957 - Libre Comida - Balatbat Pictures
1957 - Bicol Express - Premiere Productions
1957 - Prinsipe Alejandre at Don Luis"- Premiere Productions
1958 - Man on the Run - Cirio H. Santiago Film Organization
1958 - Water Lily - Premiere Productions
1958 - Obra-Maestra - People's Pictures
1964 - Ging - People's Pictures

External links
IMDb
Showbizandstyle

1926 births
2008 deaths
People from Imus
Actresses from Cavite
20th-century Filipino actresses
Filipino film actresses